Juan Camilo Gonzalez (born March 8, 1990) is a Colombian actor and singer-songwriter. His career began in 2009, when he participated in television commercials and advertisements in Texas. Gonzalez was also a candidate on Making Menudo, an MTV reality show for which they selected twenty-five bilingual male singers. Gonzalez has also made appearances in film and television, such as Parks and Recreation, the webseries Blue, and Los Americans.

Early years  
Gonzalez was born in Bogotá, Colombia in 1990. He has two younger siblings. Gonzalez was classified as a hyperactive child, and therefore earned the nickname of "terremoto" (Earthquake). Gonzalez and his family moved to Houston when he was seven years old so that his younger brother could receive medical treatment.

Gonzalez started his elementary school at Gimnasio Los Caobos in Bogota, Colombia and attended Clements High School in Sugar Land, Texas, graduating in 2009.

Career

Music 
Gonzalez has recorded original material as well as a remix of the song "El Perdón" by Enrique Iglesias and Nicky Jam. As of 2016, Gonzalez was preparing his debut solo album, titled AwakIn, which is set to feature songs in English and Spanish with a mix of Latin rhythms and American rap and pop.

Television and cinema 
Gonzalez began his acting career in television commercials in Texas. After graduating from high school, Gonzalez moved to Los Angeles where he began working in commercials and television series. He has done television commercials for Ford, Honda, and AT&T.

In January 2007, Gonzalez auditioned for Making Menudo in Los Angeles. He did not make the cut, and so he began dance lessons and auditioned again in Dallas. In Dallas, he was selected by the Puerto rican singer Luis Fonsi and the radio announcer Daniel Luna as one of the twenty-five participants who would go to New York City where they were filmed in the Road to Menudo series.

Finally in 2007, for the same Making Menudo project Gonzalez was selected to be part of the jury of the new version of the Latino boy band Menudo. The band would be a fusion of urban, pop and rock music in English and Spanish to produce several albums with the label of Sony BMG Epic Records. Several auditions were held in different cities such as Los Angeles, Dallas, Miami, New York City, among others. Gonzalez was a part of the Dallas competition where along the side of radio announcer Daniel Luna they chose varies contestants and in their pickings, Gonzalez was 1 of the 25 selected.

As part of the show, Gonzalez along with fourteen other aspiring artists, was trained in singing and dancing in South Beach, Florida for almost four months.

Gonzalez, during his acting career participated in the web series Los Americans (2011), which is characterized by having a multigenerational focus, a middle-class family living in Los Angeles. During the series, he participated with Esai Morales, Lupe Ontiveros, Tony Plana, Raymond Cruz, Yvonne DeLaRosa, and Ana Villafañe.
In 2009, Gonzalez appeared in the Parks and Recreation episode Sister City as Jhonny, a Venezuelan intern.

In 2010, Gonzalez played the lead role in the video for Kaya Rosenthal (Can't Get You Out of My Mind). Gonzalez has also appeared in Locked Up Abroad, Hard Times, How to Rock, and Parenthood.

In Banged Up Abroad, JC Gonzalez appeared as Lia McCord's brother, who was arrested at the Bangladesh Airport for trafficking narcotics.

In 2010, In The second season of the NBC comedy-drama series Parenthood (season 2) Gonzalez played the role of a dancer in the Episode The Berger Cometh.

Also in 2010, Gonzalez worked with Ariana Grande in a role of her love interest in Victorious episode Survival of the Hottest.

In Parenthood (season 2) Gonzalez did the role of a Fraternity young man in the episode Orange Alert. Then in 2011, Gonzalez worked in Big Time Strike episode of Big Time Rush.

In 2012, Gonzalez played the character of a Football Player Bully in the episode  How to Rock a Newscast of the American teen sitcom How to Rock that ran on Nickelodeon from February 4 to December 8, 2012.

During 2015 and 2018 Gonzalez's notable works included the role of "Jake" in episode "Blue Christmas" of American television series NCIS: New Orleans
, role of "Kyle" in American procedural drama television series 9-1-1 (TV series) and an appearance as "DJ Diego Spiz" in Amazon Studios's American legal drama web television Goliath (TV series).

Gonzalez starred in Los Americans, an Internet series that was launched in May 2011. In 2013, Gonzalez appeared in the web series Blue. Gonzalez has also worked on other web series, including Ragdolls in 2013. In 2015, Gonzalez took on the role of Jake in the NCIS: New Orleans program, in the episode Blue Christmas.

Personal life
Gonzalez currently resides in Sugar Land, Texas, a suburb of Houston.

JC Gonzalez has been characterized by his impetus, as indicated by the portal  'Pantallazos de Noticias' , where they claim that they have been traits of the personality of his maternal grandmother, Cándida Rueda, known for being the manager of Hotel San Carlos in Barrancabermeja, (Santander, Colombia).

The artist has also made it known through several interviews that one of his engines is his brother Daniel, who has largely overcome a strange disease called Arthrogryposis Multiplex Congenita (AMC), and has taught him that without effort there is no reward, from there, says the singer, his discipline comes.

Philanthropy 

The song "Safe Passage" was sung by JC Gonzalez for the thrive Integrative wellness and women of watts and beyond, in California, USA. He sang it in Gatherings and festivals which supports those who have survived and fighters of domestic violence.

Filmography

Film

Television

Webisodes

Commercials

Discography

References

External links 

 Official website of JC Gonzalez in English, French and Spanish.
 
 JCgonzalez in Musica.com
 JC Gonzalez in ColArte - Biblioteca Virtual del Arte en Colombia
JC GONZALEZ “ THE LORD OF POP MUSIC”

1990 births
Living people
21st-century Colombian male actors
21st-century Colombian male singers
Colombian emigrants to the United States
Colombian male film actors
Colombian male television actors
Colombian male voice actors
Colombian philanthropists
Colombian pop singers
Colombian record producers
Colombian reggaeton musicians
Colombian singer-songwriters
Contemporary R&B singers
Dance musicians
Hip hop singers
Hispanic and Latino American male actors
Latin pop singers
Male actors from Bogotá
Male actors from Houston
Musicians from Houston
Singers from Bogotá
Singers from Texas
Tenors